Robert G. Davies was a footballer who played as an inside right in the English Football League for Port Vale and then Torquay United in the early 1930s.

Career
Davies played for Stoke City and Stoke St.Peter's before joining Port Vale as an amateur in October 1931, turning professional in August 1932. He played five Second Division games in 1932–33 and two games in 1933–34, before leaving The Old Recreation Ground on a free transfer in May 1934. He moved on to Torquay United, and made five Third Division South appearances for Torquay, scoring one goal, with his last appearance coming in the 1935–36 season.

Career statistics
Source:

References

Year of birth missing
Year of death missing
Sportspeople from Oswestry
English footballers
Association football inside forwards
Stoke City F.C. players
Port Vale F.C. players
Torquay United F.C. players
English Football League players